Bedat & Co is a Swiss watch brand. The company was founded by Simone Bédat and her son Christian Bédat.

Bedat & Co is owned by Luxury Concepts, a Malaysian firm.

History 
Simone Bédat and her son Christian Bédat departed from the luxury Swiss watch brand Raymond Weil to create their own brand, Bedat, in 1996. The first collection of timepieces, the N°3, N°7., and Ref. 304, were presented in 1997 during BaselWorld.

In 2000, Gucci Group acquired 85% of Bedat & Co with Christian Bédat serving as the chairman. Simone Bedat helped her son Pro bono and was never an employee of the company. The watches in 2000 cost on average $5,000. In 2005, Gucci became sole owner of Bedat & Co after purchasing the remaining 15% of the company.

In 2006, Simone and Christian Bédat left the company. In 2008, the Swiss watch brand launched its first stand-alone boutique in Kuala Lumpur, the opening of which was officiated by Sultanah Nur Zahirah, the Raja Permaisuri Agong.

In 2009, Malaysia-based company Luxury Concepts acquired Bedat & Co and kept it a Swiss watch brand with global distribution. In 2010, Bedat & Co worked again with the designer Dino Modolo for the latest collection.

References

External links 
 Official website

Swiss companies established in 1996
Manufacturing companies established in 1996
Privately held companies of Malaysia
Swiss watch brands
Watch manufacturing companies of Switzerland